Lugoff is an unincorporated community and census-designated place (CDP) in Kershaw County, South Carolina, United States. The population was 7,434 at the 2010 census, up from 6,278 at the 2000 census. It is part of the Columbia, South Carolina Metropolitan Statistical Area.

History 
Lugoff was named for Count Lugoff. The Count was a Russian engineer who worked on construction of the Seaboard Air Line Railway in 1899. The railroad had a station in Lugoff.

Geography

Demographics

2020 census

As of the 2020 United States census, there were 9,990 people, 3,217 households, and 2,295 families residing in the CDP.

2010 census
As of the census of 2010, there were 7,434 people, 2,861 households, and 2,130 families residing in the CDP. The population density was 494.6 people per square mile (190.9/km). There were 3,017 housing units, of which 156, or 5.2%, were vacant. The racial makeup of the CDP was 79.9% white, 16.9% African American, 0.2% Native American, 0.5% Asian, 0.1% Pacific Islander, 1.0% some other races, and 1.4% from two or more races. Hispanic or Latino of any race were 2.7% of the population.

Of the 2,861 households in the CDP, 38.9% had children under the age of 18 living with them, 56.0% were headed by married couples living together, 14.0% had a female householder with no husband present, and 25.6% were non-families. 22.7% of all households were made up of individuals, and 7.9% were someone living alone who was 65 years of age or older. The average household size was 2.59, and the average family size was 3.03.

In the CDP, 26.3% of the population were under the age of 18, 6.9% were from 18 to 24, 25.2% were from 25 to 44, 28.3% were from 45 to 64, and 13.3% were 65 years of age or older. The median age was 39.2 years. For every 100 females, there were 92.8 males. For every 100 females age 18 and over, there were 87.6 males.

For the period 2013–17, the estimated median annual income for a household in the CDP was $56,665, and the median income for a family was $64,148. Male full-time workers had a median income of $45,810 versus $36,250 for females. The per capita income for the CDP was $24,386. About 10.5% of families and 15.0% of the population were below the poverty line, including 20.5% of those under age 18 and 11.3% of those age 65 or over.

Arts and culture
The Lights of Lugoff Christmas Parade takes place every Christmas season in Lugoff.

Education 
 Lugoff-Elgin High School
 Lugoff-Elgin Middle School
 Lugoff Elementary School
 Wateree Elementary School
 Doby's Mill Elementary School

Media
The West Wateree Chronicle is the consolidated newspaper that serves Lugoff, as well as nearby Elgin.

Infrastructure

Major highways

Notable people
 Brook Benton, singer and songwriter
 "Hacksaw" Jim Duggan, professional wrestler of Mid-South, WCW, and WWE fame
 Donald Leroy Truesdell, United States Marine Corps Medal of Honor recipient during the Occupation of Nicaragua
 Thomas Payne (soldier), United States Army Medal of Honor recipient for actions in the Islamic State, Best Ranger Competition winner, and Delta Force member

References

Census-designated places in Kershaw County, South Carolina
Census-designated places in South Carolina
Columbia metropolitan area (South Carolina)